Forest Hill is an underground light rail transit (LRT) station under construction on Line 5 Eglinton, a new line that is part of the Toronto subway system. It will be located in the Forest Hill neighbourhood at the intersection of Bathurst Street and Eglinton Avenue. It is scheduled to open in 2023.

The station will have two entrances. The main entrance will be at the northeast corner of Eglinton Avenue West and Bathurst Street and will be fully accessible. On-street connections will be available for TTC buses. There will be 60 exterior spaces for bicycles. The secondary entrance building will also house a traction power substation.

Station naming
During the planning stages for Line 5 Eglinton, the station was given the working name "Bathurst", which is identical to the pre-existing Bathurst station on Line 2 Bloor–Danforth. On November 23, 2015, a report to the TTC Board recommended giving a unique name to each station in the subway system (including Line 5 Eglinton). Thus, "Forest Hill" was chosen as the station's official name.

Construction
A small plaza at the northeast corner of the Eglinton and Bathurst intersection, that used to house several businesses including a coffee shop and convenience store, was demolished to make way for the main station entrance. At 874–876 Eglinton Avenue West, three storefronts were demolished to build the secondary entrance building. One of these businesses, the House of Chan, a Chinese-Canadian restaurant, was a local landmark that needed to relocate.

After completion of construction of the station headwalls, restoration of the roadway on Bathurst Street began on August 16, 2015.

On April 18, 2016, a scaffold erected across the face of the future secondary entrance collapsed, injuring seven people (three seriously). The collapsed structure was the façade of the former location of House of Chan, which was relocated eastwards along Eglinton Avenue to the west of Avenue Road.

Surface connections 

, the following are the proposed connecting routes that would serve this station when Line 5 Eglinton opens:

References

External links
 

Line 5 Eglinton stations